The 1917 Lehigh Brown and White football team was an American football team that represented Lehigh University as an independent during the 1917 college football season. In its sixth season under head coach Tom Keady, the team compiled a 7–2 record and outscored opponents by a total of 228 to 78. The team played its home games at Taylor Stadium in South Bethlehem, Pennsylvania.

Schedule

References

Lehigh
Lehigh Mountain Hawks football seasons
Lehigh football